The 1959 French Championships (now known as the French Open) was a tennis tournament that took place on the outdoor clay courts at the Stade Roland-Garros in Paris, France. The tournament ran from 19 May until 31 May. It was the 63rd staging of the French Championships, and the second Grand Slam tennis event of 1959. Nicola Pietrangeli and Christine Truman won the singles titles.

Finals

Men's singles

 Nicola Pietrangeli  defeated  Ian Vermaak 3–6, 6–3, 6–4, 6–1

Women's singles

 Christine Truman defeated  Zsuzsi Körmöczy 6–4, 7–5

Men's doubles

 Nicola Pietrangeli /   Orlando Sirola defeated  Roy Emerson /  Neale Fraser  6–3, 6–2, 14–12

Women's doubles

 Sandra Reynolds  /  Renée Schuurman defeated  Yola Ramírez /  Rosie Reyes 2–6, 6–0, 6–1

Mixed doubles

 Yola Ramírez /  Billy Knight defeated  Renée Schuurman /  Rod Laver  6–4, 6–4

References

External links
 French Open official website

French Championships
French Championships (tennis) by year
French Championships (tennis)
French Championships (tennis)
French Championships (tennis)